Josh Lovelace is a singer, songwriter and musician best known as the keyboardist for the rock band Needtobreathe. In 2017, he made his solo debut with his family-album Young Folk.

Career

Needtobreathe
In 2011, Lovelace began playing keys with Needtobreathe. Since then he's toured with the band and played on the albums The Reckoning, Rivers in the Wasteland, Live from the Woods, and Hard Love.

Solo / Young Folk 
In November 2017, Josh Lovelace released his solo family album Young Folk. Young Folk is the result of a lifelong passion for children's music, which inspired Josh to become a professional musician. Prior to recording, Lovelace became good friends with members of the group Sharon, Lois & Bram, and he considers them mentors. Sharon Hampson and Bram Morrison sing on Young Folk's "Sing a Song For Me".

In addition to Sharon Hampson and Bram Morrison, Young Folk features guest appearances by Spirit Family Reunion, Ben Rector and Ellie Holcomb.

Discography

With Needtobreathe 
 The Reckoning (2011)
 Rivers in the Wasteland (2014)
 Hard Love (2016)
 Out of Body (2020)
 Into the Mystery (2021)

As solo artist 
 Young Folk (2017)
 Growing Up (2019)

References 

Year of birth missing (living people)
Living people
21st-century American male singers
21st-century American singers
American male singer-songwriters